NA-181 Layyah-I is a constituency for the National Assembly of Pakistan.

Election 2002 

General elections were held on 10 Oct 2002. Sardar Bahadur Ahmad Khan of PML-Q won by 86,427 votes.

Election 2008 

General elections were held on 18 Feb 2008. Sardar Bahadur Ahmad Khan of PML-Q won by 58,797 votes.

Election 2013 

General elections were held on 11 May 2013. Sahibzada Faiz Ul Hassan of PML-N won by 119,403 votes and became the  member of National Assembly.

Election 2018 

General elections are scheduled to be held on 25 July 2018.

By-election 2023 
A by-election will be held on 19 March 2023 due to the resignation of Abdul Majeed Khan Niazi, the previous MNA from this seat.

See also
NA-180 Muzaffargarh-IV
NA-182 Layyah-II

References

External links 
Election result's official website

NA-181